The Shoreborne Wilson House is a historic colonial house at 4 South Main Street in Ipswich, Massachusetts.  The -story wood-frame house was built between 1685 and 1692 by Shoreborne Wilson, a cooper.  It has a basic four-room center chimney plan, of which Wilson built the northwest section.  The house was acquired by Captain Samuel Appleton in 1702, who likely built the southeast section.  In the following years the house went through a variety of uses.  It underwent a restoration of sorts in the 1920s, in which fireplaces and trim details were replaced.

The house was listed on the National Register of Historic Places in 1980.

See also
National Register of Historic Places listings in Ipswich, Massachusetts
National Register of Historic Places listings in Essex County, Massachusetts

References

Houses in Ipswich, Massachusetts
National Register of Historic Places in Ipswich, Massachusetts
Houses completed in 1685
1685 establishments in Massachusetts
Houses on the National Register of Historic Places in Essex County, Massachusetts